Horgau is a municipality in the district of Augsburg in Bavaria in Germany.

Districts (villages) of the municipality Horgau: Horgau, Horgauergreut, Auerbach, Bieselbach, Horgau Bahnhof, Lindgraben, Schäfstoß, Herpfenried

References

External links 
  

Augsburg (district)